Millard is a given name, and may refer to:

People
Millard Caldwell (1897–1984), American politician, 29th governor of Florida
Mickey Drexler (born Millard S. Drexler, 1944), American business executive, former CEO of Gap Inc.
Millard Erickson (born 1932), Protestant Christian theologian, professor of theology and author
Millard Fillmore (1800–1874), 13th president of the United States
Millard Hampton (born 1956), American former sprinter
Millard Harmon (1888–1945), World War II lieutenant general in the United States Army Air Forces
Millard Kaufman (1917–2009), American screenwriter and novelist, one of the creators of the character Mr. Magoo
Millard Mitchell (1903–1953), American actor
Millard Seldin (1926–2020), American real estate developer, banker, basketball investor, and horsebreeder
Millard Sheets (1907–1989), American artist
Millard Tydings (1890–1961), American politician, attorney, author, soldier and United States Senator from Maryland
Millard K. Wilson (1890–1933), American silent film actor

Fictional characters
Millard J. Monkey, from Jungle Jam and Friends: The Radio Show!
Millard Salter, the title character of the novel Millard Salter's Last Day
Millard the Mallard,  mascot of WRVA radio in Richmond, Virginia